Iqra may refer to the 96th chapter of the Qur'an. It is also used as a name for people or educational institutions such as

Education
Iqra Academy, a girls-only independent secondary school in Peterborough, England
Iqra Institute for Higher Education, a Somali institute for higher education in Badhan, Somalia
Iqra National University, a university in Peshawar, Pakistan
Iqra University, a university in Karachi, Pakistan
Iqra Schools and Colleges Sadiqbad, an education institute located in Sadiqabad, Pakistan

Other
Iqra (name)

See also
Rockford Iqra School